Bořek Dočkal (born 30 September 1988) is a Czech former professional footballer who played as a midfielder and captained Sparta Prague. He has previously spent time with Turkish side Konyaspor and Norwegian side Rosenborg. Dočkal represented the Czech Republic at youth international level, and was the captain of the under-21 team, and has later become captain of his nation at senior level.

Club career

Early career
Dočkal began his football career in Poděbrady. The midfielder moved to Slavie Prague at the age of 10. Dočkal went through all the youth teams of Slavia and made his debut on the first team against SK Kladno. He scored his first goal for Slavia in his third match against FK Teplice. Dočkal was sent on a loan to Czech First League side Slovan Liberec in winter 2008, where he signed a contract several months later.

Dočkal went on a one-year loan to Turkish Super League side Konyaspor in July 2010.

Rosenborg
In August 2011 Dočkal signed a long-term contract with Norwegian side Rosenborg. He contributed with one assist in his first game, where Rosenborg won 3–1 over rivals Molde. During the UEFA Europa League 2012–13, he scored 7 goals in 12 matches (6 goals in 7 games over the course of the preliminary stages), including a dramatic last-minute goal against Kazakh club FC Ordabasy on 26 July 2012, to propel 9-man Rosenborg to a 4–3 aggregate win. After two years with Rosenborg, during which he scored 14 goals in 55 league-matches, Dočkal returned to the Czech Republic in August 2013 signing a three-year contract with Sparta Prague.

Henan Jianye
In February 2017, Dočkal secured a transfer from Sparta Prague to Henan Jianye competing in the Chinese Super League. The transfer was reported in the range of €8.5 million, among the highest recorded for the Czech top division. Dočkal made 23 starts and scored four goals during the 2017 season.

Loan to Philadelphia Union
In February 2018, Dočkal signed a loan move with the Philadelphia Union in Major League Soccer as the team's third designated player. After a few matches with his new team, Dočkal's first goal was a game-winner for the Union against D.C. United. Dočkal proved to be successful in Philadelphia, earning the Union's most valuable player for the season and setting the record for most assists for a season, and lead Major League Soccer in assists for the 2018 season.

Return to Sparta
In February 2019, he returned again to Sparta Prague.

International career
Dočkal was the captain and one of the key players in the Czech U-21 team. He represented the team at the 2011 UEFA European Under-21 Football Championship. Dočkal is the current captain of the Czech Republic national football team. After the unsuccessful qualification for World Cup 2018, Dočkal was nominated by the present coach Jaroslav Šilhavý to the squad for the newly established League of Nations. Dockal became a captain and made two assists in the match against Slovakia.

Career statistics

Club

International goals
Scores and results list Czech Republic's goal tally first, score column indicates score after each Dočkal goal.

References

External links

 
 
 
 
 
 

1988 births
Living people
People from Městec Králové
Czech footballers
Czech Republic youth international footballers
Czech Republic under-21 international footballers
Czech Republic international footballers
Association football midfielders
SK Slavia Prague players
SK Kladno players
FC Slovan Liberec players
Konyaspor footballers
Rosenborg BK players
AC Sparta Prague players
Henan Songshan Longmen F.C. players
Philadelphia Union players
Czech First League players
Süper Lig players
Eliteserien players
Chinese Super League players
Major League Soccer players
Czech expatriate footballers
Expatriate footballers in Turkey
Expatriate footballers in Norway
Expatriate footballers in China
UEFA Euro 2016 players
Czech expatriate sportspeople in China
Czech expatriate sportspeople in Norway
Czech expatriate sportspeople in Turkey
Designated Players (MLS)
Czech expatriate sportspeople in the United States
Expatriate soccer players in the United States
Sportspeople from the Central Bohemian Region